The 2021–22 season is Hull City's 118th year in their history and first season back in the Championship since 2019–20 following promotion last season. Along with the league, the club will also compete in the FA Cup and the EFL Cup. The season covers the period from 1 July 2021 to 30 June 2022.

Events
 On 25 June 2021, the club announced that local based building supplies firm MKM Building Supplies Ltd. had agreed a 5-year sponsorship deal for the stadium and it was being renamed the MKM Stadium.
 On 1 July 2021, Martin Samuelsen signed a permanent deal with Norwegian side FK Haugesund for an undisclosed fee.
 On 7 July 2021, Ryan Longman of Brighton & Hove Albion joined the club on a season-long loan.
 On 8 July 2021, the EFL announced that the club were under a transfer embargo for "conditions under monitored loan agreement" which was arranged because of the COVID-19 pandemic. The club later issued a statement to clarify the position.
 On 9 July 2021, Billy Chadwick moved to  Linfield on loan until January 2022, while Ahmed Salam also went on a season-long loan to Linfield.
 On 13 July 2021, Tom Nixon joined the Academy from Stoke City on a one-year deal.
 On 30 July 2021, Di'Shon Bernard of Manchester United signed a season-long loan deal with the club.
 On 5 August 2021, James Berry signed for Altrincham on a free transfer.
 On 6 August 2021, the club released Jordan Flores from his contract, so he could join Northampton Town permanently, rather than play there on a season-long loan deal.
 On 6 August 2021, Festus Arthur joined Barrow on a season-long loan deal.
 On 6 August 2021, Matt Smith joined the club on a season-long loan spell from Manchester City.
 On 16 August 2021, Thomas Mayer was released from his contract and moved to SKU Amstetten.
 On 17 August 2021, Tom Huddlestone returned to Hull City on a year-long contract.
 On 20 August 2021, Matty Jacob moved to Gateshead on loan until January 2022, but was switched to a season-long loan in January 2022.
 On 20 August 2021, James Scott went to Hibernian on a season-long loan.
 On 27 August 2021, Tyler Smith, of Sheffield United, signed a two-year deal with the club for an undisclosed fee.
 On 28 August 2021, Jake Leake joined Boston United on a month-long loan spell, this was later extended for a further month.
 On 30 August 2021, Andy Smith moved to Salford City on a season-long loan.
 On 31 August 2021, Harry Wood moved to Scunthorpe United on a season-long loan.
 On 18 September 2021, Harvey Cartwright joined Gainsborough Trinity on a month-long loan spell.
 On 20 September 2021, Billy Clarke joined the club as under-18's assistant manager.
 On 7 October 2021, Jevon Mills signed a two-year deal with the club.
 On 13 October 2021, the club announced that they had agreed a year extension to their deal with kit suppliers, Umbro.
 On 19 November 2021, Harry Fisk and Josh Hinds moved to Spalding United on a month-long loan.
 On 24 November 2021, Billy Chadwick returned from his loan spell at Linfield because of an anterior cruciate ligament knee injury.
 On 14 December 2021, Harry Lovick joined Pickering Town on a month-long loan spell.
 On 17 December 2021, Louis Beckett joined Ossett United on a month-long loan spell.
 On 17 December 2021, McCauley Snelgrove joined Cleethorpes Town on a month-long loan spell, this was later extended for a further month.
 On 23 December 2021, Jake Leake rejoined Boston United on a month-long loan spell.
 On 30 December 2021, Josh Hinds was recalled from his loan at Spalding United because of a number of Hull City players affected by COVID-19.
 On 13 January 2022, Josh Magennis joined Wigan Athletic on a two-and-a-half-year deal, for an undisclosed fee.
 On 14 January 2022, Andy Smith was recalled from Salford City and immediately loaned to Grimsby Town for the remainder of the season.
 On 18 January 2022, Callum Jones and Festus Arthur were recalled from their loan spells at Morecambe and Barrow respectively.
 On 19 January 2022, ahead of the match against Blackburn Rovers, the club announced that Acun Medya, backed by Acun Ilıcalı, had purchased the club from Assem Allam.
 On 25 January 2022, it was announced that Grant McCann and Cliff Byrne would be leaving the club.
 On 26 January 2022, it was announced that the club had repaid the EFL loan taken out because of the COVID-19 pandemic and thus the transfer embargo has been lifted.
 On 27 January 2022, Regan Slater of Sheffield United returned to the club after signing a two-and-a-half-year deal for an undisclosed fee.
 On 27 January 2022, Jevon Mills joined Falkirk on loan until the end of the season.
 On 27 January 2022, Will Jarvis joined York City on a month-long loan.
 On 27 January 2022, Shota Arveladze was announced as the new head coach of the club, on a two-and-a-half-year deal. The vice-chairman of the club was Tan Kesler.
 On 31 January 2022, Matt Smith was recalled by Manchester City.
 On 31 January 2022, Harry Wood was recalled from his loan at Scunthorpe United.
 On 31 January 2022, Allahyar Sayyadmanesh joined from Fenerbahçe on loan until the end of the season.
 On 31 January 2022, Ryan Longman signed a three-and-a-half year deal for an undisclosed fee, converting his loan from Brighton & Hove Albion into a permanent deal.
 On 31 January 2022, Marcus Forss joined the club on loan from Brentford until the end of the season.
 On 31 January 2022, Liam Walsh joined the club on loan from Swansea City until the end of the season.
 On 11 February 2022, Peter van der Veen joined as assistant head coach.
 On 15 February 2022, James Rodwell was appointed as CEO of the club.
 On 5 March 2022, the East Stand of the MKM Stadium was renamed the Chris Chilton Stand, in honour of Hull City's all-time record goalscorer, Chris Chilton, ahead of the home fixture against West Bromwich Albion.
 On 5 March 2022, Callum Jones moved to Grimsby Town on a month-long loan spell,  but on 20 March 2022, he returned to Hull following a groin injury that ruled him out for the rest of the season.
 On 11 March 2022, Louis Beckett joined Bridlington Town on a month-long loan spell.
 On 16 March 2022, Oliver Green joined Bridlington Town on a month-long loan spell.
 On 18 March 2022, Will Jarvis joined Scarborough Athletic on loan until the end of the season.
 On 18 March 2022, Josh Hinds joined Gainsborough Trinity on a month-long loan spell.
 On 22 March 2022, McCauley Snelgrove rejoined Cleethorpes Town on loan until the end of the season.
 On 22 March 2022, Rio Dyer joined Cinderford Town on work experience until the end of the season.
 On 24 March 2022,  Tom Nixon joined Pickering Town on loan until the end of the season.
 On 24 March 2022, Andy Cannon joined Stockport County on loan until the end of the season.
 On 25 March 2022, David Robson joined Farsley Celtic on loan until the end of the season.
 On 26 March 2022, Sam Deacon joined Hall Road Rangers  on loan until the end of the season.
 On 29 March 2022, Henry Curtis joined Hall Road Rangers on work experience until the end of the season.
 On 1 May 2022, Matt Ingram joined Luton Town on an emergency seven-day loan to cover for James Shea who suffered a knee injury in the game against Cardiff City, with Luton reaching the play-offs the loan was extended to 18 May.
 On 7 May 2022, Tony Pennock stepped down from the coaching staff after 8-years with the club.

 On 13 May 2022, Andy Dawson was promoted from the Academy Coaching Staff to first team coach following the departure of Tony Pennock.
 On 13 May 2022, the club announced Corendon Airlines as the club's first-ever official travel partner.
 On 18 May 2022, the club indicated they would not take-up the options of a further year on contracts of Tom Eaves, Tom Huddlestone and Richard Smallwood. Options for an additional year have been exercised on the contracts of Matt Ingram, Callum Elder, Josh Emmanuel, George Honeyman and Mallik Wilks.
 On 25 May 2022, Harvey Cartwright signed a four-year deal with the club.
 On 16 June 2022, Matt Ingram signed a new three-year contract, with the club holding an option for a further year.

Players

Current squad

Out on loan

Transfers

Transfers in

Loans in

Transfers out

Loans out

Pre-season
Pre-season training started on 28 June 2021 at the club's Cottingham training ground.
A week-long training camp follows in Scotland.

The first friendly matches announced take place on 24 July, with a 12 o'clock home match against Mansfield Town, and a 3 o'clock away match at Glanford Park against Scunthorpe United. A further friendly match was announced for 7 o'clock 30 July 2021 away to Sunderland. On 27 July, a practice match against Manchester United U23s was also added to the schedule, to be held on 31 July 2021, behind closed doors.

Competitions

Overall

Championship

The first matches of the 2021–22 season are scheduled to take place on 7 August 2021 with the season concluding on the weekend of 7 to 8 May 2022. Hull City's fixtures were revealed on 24 June 2021 and the season starts with an away match against Preston North End. The season ends with a home match against Nottingham Forest.

League table

Results summary

Results by matchday

Matches

FA Cup

Hull City entered the competition in the third-round, the draw for which took place on 6 December 2021. Hull were drawn at home to Everton with the match taking place between 7 and 10 January 2022.
The match was selected for live broadcast on BBC One.

EFL Cup

Hull City were in the northern section of the draw and were drawn at home to Wigan Athletic in the first round. The match took place on 10 August 2021, and with few real chances in the first half. The second half saw an early attempt by Stephen Humphrys saved by Nathan Baxter. On 50-minutes a header by Humphrys was spilled by Baxter, but he was on hand to convert the rebound. Minutes later Keane Lewis-Potter brought Hull level with a shot from the edge of the area. With no more goals the match finished 1–1 and sent the game to a penalty shoot out. Fifteen penalties were converted, before Di'Shon Bernard sent his effort over the crossbar, leaving Jordan Cousins to put Wigan through to the Second Round.

Statistics

Appearances

Note: Appearances shown after a "+" indicate player came on during course of match.

Top goalscorers

Disciplinary record

Kits
On 18 June 2021, the club unveiled the new home kit for the season, the shirts described as amber and "features a diagonal pattern with a striking black sash and stylised crew neckline, with 'Tigers' lettering on the back". The shorts are to be black with amber side panels while the socks are amber with black detail. Local company Giacom would continue as main shirt sponsors, with On Line Group continuing as back-of-shirt sponsors. The away kit was revealed on 9 July 2021, a blackout kit with a "tone-on-tone front stripe". The shorts would be black with a tonal side panel and black socks with tonal cuff detail.
The third kit for the season was unveiled on 10 September 2021, as a claret shirt with black shoulders and an amber trim. The shorts would be amber with a black side panel and the socks claret, with black top and amber hoop.

Awards
The annual awards for the club saw Keane Lewis-Potter pick-up the Player of the Year, Players' Player of the Year and Supporters' Player of the Year awards.
Ryan Longman was presented with the Goal of the Season award for his goal against Everton on 8 January 2021 in the FA Cup which sent the match in to extra time. Jacob Greaves took the award for Young Player of the Year for the second year in a row. The Academy Player of the Year award went to Jevon Mills.

References

Hull City
Hull City A.F.C. seasons
2020s in Kingston upon Hull